Anna Thomas (born July 12, 1948) is a German-born American author, screenwriter, and film producer. She is best known as the author of the 1972 vegetarian cookbook, The Vegetarian Epicure, which contributed to the rise of the vegetarian movement of the 1970s. She is currently Discipline Head of the Screenwriting department at the American Film Institute.

Anna Thomas wrote her first cookbook The Vegetarian Epicure (1972) while still a film student at UCLA. It had a strong impact on the natural foods movement within the American counterculture. 

Her master's thesis film, a dramatic feature titled The Haunting of M, a turn of the century ghost story, shot in Scotland.  It was well received by film critics and shown at festivals and art houses.

Cookbooks
Vegetarian
 The Vegetarian Epicure Alfred A. Knopf, 1972, 305 pages. .
 The Vegetarian Epicure, Book Two Alfred A. Knopf, 1978, 401 pages. .
 The New Vegetarian Epicure Alfred A. Knopf, 1996, 450 pages. .
Vegetarian and Vegan
 Love Soup W. W. Norton & Company, 2009, 528 pages. .
Vegan Vegetarian Omnivore: Dinner for Everyone at the Table.  W. W. Norton & Company, 2016, 496 pages. .

Screenwriting filmography
 The Confessions of Amans (1977)
 The Haunting of M (1981), also produced
 The End of August (1982)
 El Norte (1983), also produced
 A Time of Destiny (1988), also produced
 My Family/Mi Familia (1995), also produced
 Frida (2002)

Awards and nominations

Nominated
 James Beard Foundation Award: Vegetarian, for The New Vegetarian Epicure: Menus for Families and Friends (1997).
 Academy Awards: Best Writing, Screenplay Written Directly for the Screen, for El Norte (1983).
 Writers Guild of America: Best Screenplay Written Directly for the Screen, for El Norte (1983).

Won
 James Beard Foundation Award: Best Healthy Focus Cookbook, for Love Soup (2010).

References

External links

 
 

1948 births
20th-century American non-fiction writers
21st-century American non-fiction writers
21st-century American women writers
20th-century American women writers
American cookbook writers
American film producers
American screenwriters
American vegetarianism activists
American women screenwriters
German emigrants to the United States
American women film producers
American women non-fiction writers
Living people
Vegetarian cookbook writers